Shymkent (Шымкент, Şymkent), known until 1993 as Chimkent,is a city in Kazakhstan. It is near the border with Uzbekistan. It is one of three Kazakh cities which have the status equal to that of a region (“city of republican significance”). It is the third-most populous city in Kazakhstan, behind Almaty and Astana, with an estimated population of 1,002,291 . According to regional and city officials, the millionth resident of Shymkent was born on 17 May 2018. It is a regional cultural centre.
It is also  to the north of Tashkent, Uzbekistan.

Etymology
The name Chimkent comes from two Sogdian words, chim (meaning 'turf') and kent (or kand) (meaning 'city') (also found in the name of nearby Toshkent); thus, it literally means "the city in the grass/turf."
After Kazakhstan gained independence, the city was renamed Shymkent in 1993 as part of the government's campaign to apply Kazakh names to cities. The formal spelling of Shymkent, as codified in Kazakhstan's Constitution, goes against the original Uzbek spelling rules of never having the letter "ы" follow the letter "ш". (Uzbek itself has no letter ы. Furthermore, what is spelled as ш in Kazakh is spelled as ч in Uzbek.) As a result, the new name Шымкент (Shymkent) is used only in Kazakhstan, while other countries continue to use the original spelling Чимкент (Chimkent).

History
Shymkent was founded in the twelfth century as a caravanserai to protect a nearby Silk Road trade town, Sayram, 10 km to the east. Shymkent grew as a market center for trade between Turkic nomads and the settled Sogdians. It was destroyed several times: by Genghis Khan, soldiers from the southern Khanates, and by nomad attacks. In the early 19th century, it became part of the khanate of Kokand before it was captured by the Russians in 1864. It was renamed Chernyaev in 1914 and renamed Shymkent in 1924. Following the Russian conquest, Shymkent was a city of trade between nomadic Turks and sedentary Turks, and was famous for its kumis.
Shymkent was founded as a hub for economic development in South Kazakhstan in the 20th century, and rapid growth was evolving in the second half of the century. To date, there are about 70 factories, plants and other manufacturing companies in the area.
A settlement on the territory of modern Shymkent already existed at the turn of the 11th – 12th centuries. At the same time, there is a hypothesis about its earlier establishment based on the burials found during the archaeological excavations, which, according to experts, date back to the 5th – 6th centuries. In the sources that have reached our time, the Central Asian historian Sharaf ad-din Yazdi (1425) first mentioned Shymkent in the book Zafar Name (Book of Victories), when describing the military campaigns of Timur.
Chimkent (Shymkent), as a city-settlement already existed in the 6th century AD. Its name links to the famous traveler Xuan Jiang, who mentioned it in his notes about Isfijab - Sairam.
It is widely believed that the city existed in the 12th century. This information is taken from the book of A. Dobrosmyslov "Cities of the Syr-Darya region", where he reports the following: "The name of the city of Chimkent comes from the words chim - sod and kent - city. Indigenous people of Chimkent relate the time of its establishment to the 12th century, referring to the grave of St. Baba Dervish, a contemporary of Khoja Ahmet Yasawi."

In 1914, in honour of the 50th anniversary of Shymkent becoming part of the Russian Empire, the city was named Chernyaev, but in 1924 the Soviet authorities returned to the city its former name.
A lead plant was built in Shymkent in the 1930s. It accounted for 70% of the total lead produced in the Soviet Union. An oil and fat plant, a hosiery and a mirror factory were commissioned. In 1932, an agricultural aviation base was created, which led to the creation and development of the city airport.
During the Second World War, a number of Soviet industrial enterprises were evacuated in Shymkent. From the front line, 17 plants and factories were relocated here. The city produced spare parts for tanks, shells, metal, lead for bullets, optical instruments and other products. Seven Shymkent residents were awarded the title of the Hero of the Soviet Union.
There was a gulag near Shymkent, and as a result, many Russian-speaking people came to the area through imprisonment in that gulag.
In January 2015, Shymkent officials sent a request to UNESCO to be recognized as an ancient city.
Until 2018, Shymkent was the administrative center of South Kazakhstan Region. On 19 June 2018 it was taken out of South Kazakhstan Region and subordinated directly to the government of Kazakhstan. As a result, the administrative center of the region is moved to Turkistan, and the region was renamed as Turkistan Region.

Geography

Climate
Shymkent features a humid continental climate (Köppen Dsa) bordering on a mediterranean climate (Csa). Shymkent features hot, relatively dry summers and cold winters. Winter snowfalls are common, although rainfall during that season occurs mixed in with that. Shymkent averages just under  of precipitation annually.

Vegetation
The vegetation of the city is known for its extreme diversity. Trees like oak, elm, poplar, cannan maple, willow, chestnut, acacia, ailanthus, thuja, pine, spruce grow in the city. Farm horticultural crops cherry, apricot, dried apricot, plum, pomegranate, walnut, quince, and grape varieties are widespread.

Demographics

According to a government estimate in 2012, the city had 669,326 inhabitants.
By the beginning of 2015, Shymkent was joined by the areas of adjacent districts. In this connection, the city population has increased up to 858,147 people within the new boundaries by the beginning of 2015. By that time, 711,783 people resided in the former area of Shymkent. By 1 June 2018, the population of Shymkent was 1,002,291.

The following tables are the total population of Shymkent since 1897:

Ethnic groups (2020):
Kazakh: 67.47%
Uzbek: 17.69%
Russian: 8.91%
Azerbaijani: 1.74%
Tatar: 1.01%
Others: 3.18%

Region and development 

On 19 June 2018 by the decree of the President of Kazakhstan, Shymkent was recognized as one of Kazakhstan's cities with a population of over a million people, along with the capital, Astana, and Almaty. Shymkent was given the status of a city of republican significance. It was removed from the South Kazakhstan region, which was renamed Turkestan by the same decree. The city of Shymkent became an independent administrative-territorial unit, and the 17th region in Kazakhstan.

In 2016, construction began on Shymkent City, a new district comprising residential and administrative areas, in the northern part of the city. This construction is part of then-President of Kazakhstan Nursultan Nazarbayev's promotion of the development of Shymkent as the "third Kazakhstani megalopolis".

Economy
Formerly dominated by lead mining, industrial growth began in the 1930s.
A lead smelter was opened in Shymkent in 1934 or 1938. It supplied a major part of the USSR's metals needs, copper as well as lead and others, including three-quarters of all bullets fired by the Red Army. Smelting continued until 2008, causing extreme levels of pollution (lead, cadmium, etc.) in the surrounding ground, and then controversially restarted in 2010, briefly, under a major UK-listed company, Kazakhmys.
The city also has industries producing refined zinc, processed karakul pelts, textiles, foodstuffs, and pharmaceuticals. Also, the city has a medium-sized refinery, which is owned and operated by PetroKazakhstan.
Shymkent is one of the leading industrial and economic centres of Kazakhstan. The city has industrial enterprises of non-ferrous metallurgy, mechanical engineering, chemical, oil refining and food industries.
The petrochemical and pharmaceutical industries include "PetroKazakhstan Oil Products" LLP (oil refining), "Khimpharm" JSC (medicines). Metallurgical goods are produced by "Yuzhpolymetal" JSC (lead and other products).
Mechanical engineering is represented by Cardanval JSC (cardan shafts and crosspieces for cars and tractors), Yuzhmash JSC (forging and pressing machines, spare parts and equipment), Elektroapparat LLP (power switches and other products).
As for light industry, enterprises include "Voskhod" (garments from woolen and semi-woolen fabrics: suits, coats, jackets, etc.), "Adal" (textile), "Elastic" (socks from high-quality yarn). Construction materials are produced by "Shymkentcement" and "Kurylys materialdary" JSC (bricks).
"Shymkentmai" JSC and "Kainar" LLP (processing of cotton, sunflower, safflower, soybean, production of refined edible oil and other products), "Shymkentpivo" JSC (beer), "Visit" JSC (soft drinks), "Shymkentsut" JSC (dairy products) are also operating in the city.

Industrial production increased by 15% compared to 2018.
Agricultural production increased by 6.3%, housing construction - by 19.2%, retail trade - by 7.1%.
In the last 3 years, as part of the Industrial and Innovative Development Programme, 24 enterprises were opened in Shymkent, and 1,300 permanent jobs were created.
There are 2 industrial zones in the city. To date investments worth 64 billion tenge have been attracted, 72 projects have been launched, more than 4,000 people have been employed.
In February 2021, it was announced that authorities in Shymkent are planning for 123 investment projects worth over 1.36 trillion tenge (US$3.3 billion) to be launched over the next 5 years. These projects are expected to create approximately 11,500 jobs for the region.

Culture
Shymkent has throughout its 2200-year history been under many different cultural influences of its controlling civilizations. Shymkent served as the Cultural Capital of the Commonwealth of Independent States in 2020.

Transportation

Public Transport
The city is a major railroad junction in the Turkestan-Siberia Railway. All passenger trains are operated by Kazakhstan Temir Zholy. The express trains using comfortable Tulpar Talgo rolling stock. The Bus service uses modern Yutong CNG buses to reach close to every corner of the city and also decrease the air pollution of the region. A bicycle-sharing system operates in Shymkent with 40 stations around the city. At some parks and public places are also e-scooters are available for sharing.

Roads
Currently, there are over two thousand streets in the city, the total length of all streets and roads is 2135 km.
Major roads passing through Shymkent include M32 (to Aktobe, Oral and Samara) and A2 (Tashkent and Almaty).

Airports
The Shymkent International Airport was opened in 1932 and is located 12 km northwest of the city center. The airport offers air connections to all major cities in Kazakhstan and with like Dubai, Moscow and Istanbul also international connections. Another small airfield is located near Sairam and is used mostly for sport and agriculture flights.

Sightseeing

Streets 
Before 1864, the city consisted of a chaotic interweaving of winding streets around the citadel of the ancient city of Shymkent (the so-called "Old City"). But after it became a town of the Syrdarya region in 1867, the "New City" gradually emerged - an area that has a rectangular-quarter street layout. It was limited to Nikolaevskaya (now Kazybek-bi), Stepnaya (Kunaev Boulevard), Sadovaya (Tauke Khan Avenue) and Meshchanskaya (now Turkestan) streets.

Ordabasy Square

In the 19th century, the eastern border of the city passed here, and there were also fortified gates leading to Sayram and Taraz. In those days, there was a bazaar nearby, therefore this square was called Bazaar; the street got the same name, which originated from this square.

Currently, three streets converge on the Ordabasy Square, named after three Kazakh wise men - Tole Bi, Kazybek Bi, Aiteke Bi. The monument Zher-ana was erected right in the center of the square. It has three faces with a height of 34 meters. Famous quotes of the three wise Kazakh men are carved on each face of the monument. The top of the monument is crowned by the figure of a young woman, symbolizing Mother Earth, who releases seven swallows into the sky.
Under the square flows the Koshkar Ata river and the square contains two fountains next to the monument.
The Ordabasy Square connects to the Independence Park through a 104-meter-long pedestrian bridge.

Parks 
Ken Baba Park
This park (formerly the Cathedral Garden, Nikolsky Church Park, and Children's Park) is one of the oldest in the city, located on Kazybek Bi Street at the intersection with Tauke Khan Avenue. In 1908, St. Nicholas Cathedral was built in the area by the architect Matsevich, which opened in the autumn of 1914. This three-story building is considered one of the best examples of religious construction in the "red brick style." In the Soviet years, it was transformed into a regional library, and later into the Palace of Pioneers. Now it is the regional puppet theatre.

Valuable trees (mainly oaks) planted here in the late 19th and early 20th centuries and still grow in the park. Currently, there are numerous children's attractions and catering establishments. The water of the spring source is sent to artificial waterfalls that flow into decorative ponds, then the water is redistributed through the channels. Waterfowl and decorative fish can be spotted in the water.

Central Park

This park (formerly the Public City Garden) is also located on Kazybek Bi Street near Ken Baba Park. It was built at the end of the 19th century, almost simultaneously with the Cathedral Garden.

Dendropark

The Dendropark was built in 1980 at the outskirts of the city. Because of the fast growth of the city it is now inside of the city and located at the Prospekt Baydibek Bi. The park cover a area of 150 ha and there are about half of million trees and shrubs of 1360 different types. Most of them are rare and exotic types from different regions of the world. In the center of the park is a huge pond where visitors can rent Pedalos or Rowing boats to discover the park by boat. The park additional offers a [Cycling|cycling] and running track, some small drink and food shops and a bike rental shop.

Abay Park

The Abay Park is named after the Kazakh poet Abay and is located in the heart of the city. A museum and a monument about Abay is located near the south entrance at the Zheltoqsan Street. In the center of the park is a huge World War II memorial with an eternal flame. A art gallery and a public swimming pool are located in the northern part of Abay Park.

Independence Park

The Independence Park was created for the 20th anniversary of Kazakhstan's Independence in 2011. The park offers a Singing fountain, a 50 metres high flagpole, pavilions, playgrounds and the monument named Altyn Shanyraq. The park is located near the Citadel, the Ordabasy Square and the train station.

Landmarks
Koshkar Ata mosque

The Koshkar Ata mosque also known as Zhami Mosque was built in 1850–1856. It was erected by Ferghana masters in the style of quarterly mosques of frontal composition. Initially, the building was built of mud brick, but due to flooding by the river, it collapsed over time. Therefore, in 1891–1893 the mosque was rebuilt with burnt bricks. The main facade was made in the form of a three-arch structure, the building had a right and left wing. In 2009, the left wing was destroyed despite the fact that the mosque is protected by law as a monument of architecture.

Old city

The old city began to appear thanks to artisans and farmers who began to settle at the foot of the citadel of the ancient city of Shymkent in the 16th century.

Today, the streets of the Old City follow the outlines of the streets of past centuries. But only two architectural objects of the century before last have survived - the Koshkar Ata mosque and the house of the district chief. In the late period of the Soviet Union, a plan was created to preserve the Old City as an open-air museum with special requirements for newly erected buildings to combine the historical and modern architectural style. After the fall of the Soviet Union the plans were not realized.

Sport
FC Ordabasy - Men's football team (Current playing in Kazakhstan Premier League)
BIIK Kazygurt - Women's football team

Kazhymukan Munaitpasov Stadium is the main stadium in the city. Its capacity is 20,000. It is the base of FC Ordabasy.

Notable people
 
 
 Iordanis Pechlivanidis (born 1986), footballer

Twin cities

Twin Cities is the name of the sister cities program.

Gallery

References

External links

shymkent.info
shymkent.gov.kz 

 
Cities and towns in Kazakhstan
Cities in Central Asia
Populated places along the Silk Road
Populated places in Turkistan Region
Syr-Darya Oblast